Ng Ting Lam Kudama (aka Ng Ting-lam) is a Hong Kong politician affiliated with the Democratic Party (Hong Kong). She is a former member of the Sha Tin District Council for the constituency of Tai Wai.

Political career
Ng was elected to the Sha Tin District Council for the constituency of Tai Wai in the 2019 Hong Kong District Council elections, beating incumbent Kelly Tung by 4,198 votes to 4,114.

References

External links
Sha Tin District Council - Information of DC Members 
Democratic Party - NG Ting Lam

Living people
District councillors of Sha Tin District
Democratic Party (Hong Kong) politicians
Hong Kong women in politics
Year of birth missing (living people)